The 2011–12 Elite Ice Hockey League season featured 10 teams. It started on 3 September 2011 and finished on 8 April 2012. The Fife Flyers replaced the Newcastle Vipers.

Teams

Elite League Table

GP=Games Played
W=Win,
L=Lose,
OTW=Over Time Wins,
OTL=Over Time Loses,
Pts=Points,

Elite League play-offs

After the two legged quarter finals the end of season playoffs were held at the National Ice Centre in Nottingham during the weekend of 7 and 8 April 2012. 
Regular season league winners Belfast Giants lost in the semi finals to Cardiff Devils.
The title was won by the Nottingham Panthers after defeating Cardiff Devils 2–0, the second successive time that Nottingham had beaten Cardiff in the final.

Challenge Cup

 NOTE: Some Cup games double up as League games due to scheduling constraints.

Top 2 in each group qualify for Semi-finals

(Q) means teams has qualified for Semi-finals

Group A

Group B

Knockout stages

 The Knockout Stages will be played over 2-Legs, Home and Away. (Aggregate Scores shown, First and Second Leg scores in brackets)

References

External links
Official Site

Elite Ice Hockey League seasons
1
United